Lynch Chapel United Methodist Church is a historic Methodist church located near Morgantown, Monongalia County, West Virginia. It was built in 1902, and is a small, one-story, rectangular church in the Late Gothic Revival style.  It features a steeple bell tower with a pyramidal roof with folk Victorian accents such as delicate brackets and scrollwork.

It was listed on the National Register of Historic Places in 2006.

References

Churches on the National Register of Historic Places in West Virginia
United Methodist churches in West Virginia
Gothic Revival church buildings in West Virginia
Churches completed in 1902
20th-century Methodist church buildings in the United States
Buildings and structures in Morgantown, West Virginia
National Register of Historic Places in Monongalia County, West Virginia